Lesley Lewis may refer to:

Lesley Lewis (script editor), Australian scriptwriter and editor
Lesley Lewis (art historian) (1909–2010), English historian of art and architecture

See also
Leslie Lewis (disambiguation)
Lesle Lewis (disambiguation)